Paul Doyle may refer to:
Paul Doyle (politician) (born 1963), American politician in Connecticut
Paul Doyle (journalist), Irish sportswriter for the British newspaper The Guardian
Paul Doyle (baseball) (born 1939), Major League Baseball pitcher
Paul Doyle (Scottish footballer) (born 1984), East Stirlingshire defender
Paul Doyle (Gaelic footballer) (1899–1953), Irish Gaelic footballer